Levi Barnabas (born January 24, 1964) is a Canadian politician. He was elected to the Legislative Assembly of Northwest Territories in 1995 and served until Nunavut was created in 1999. Barnabas served as the first Speaker in the Legislative Assembly of Nunavut.

Biography 
In 1999 he was elected to the 1st Legislative Assembly of Nunavut but had to resign in August 2000 after being convicted of sexual assault. The conviction came at the same time as James Arvaluk was charged with assault against his girlfriend. He pleaded guilty and resigned. The two scandals rocked the new government, and caused a substantial drop in positive public opinion. The resignation led to the first by-election in Nunavut history.

Barnabas ran in the December 2000 by-election but was defeated by Rebekah Williams. He ran again in the 2004 Nunavut election in a hotly contested race and defeated Williams by doubling her vote count.

References

External links
An Overwhelming Agenda? Nunatsiaq News 22 September 2000
Levi Barnabas at the Legislative Assembly of Nunavut
Quttiktuq riding profile CBC

1964 births
Inuit from the Northwest Territories
Members of the Legislative Assembly of the Northwest Territories
Members of the Legislative Assembly of Nunavut
Living people
Inuit politicians
People from Igloolik
Speakers of the Legislative Assembly of Nunavut
20th-century Canadian legislators
21st-century Canadian legislators
Inuit from Nunavut